Nicholas "Nick" Sillitoe (born September 1971) is an English composer/music producer.

Based in Norway, Sillitoe won the 2015 Amanda Award for Best Music for the film Dirk Ohm.

Sillitoe has composed the music for the Norwegian TV-drama series Okkupert.

He is married to Velvet Belly singer Anne Marie Almedal.

References

External links

1971 births
Living people
English film score composers
English male film score composers
English television composers
English male composers
British emigrants to Norway